= Shoemaker Hall =

Coordinates: 45°33′0″N 94°9′0″W

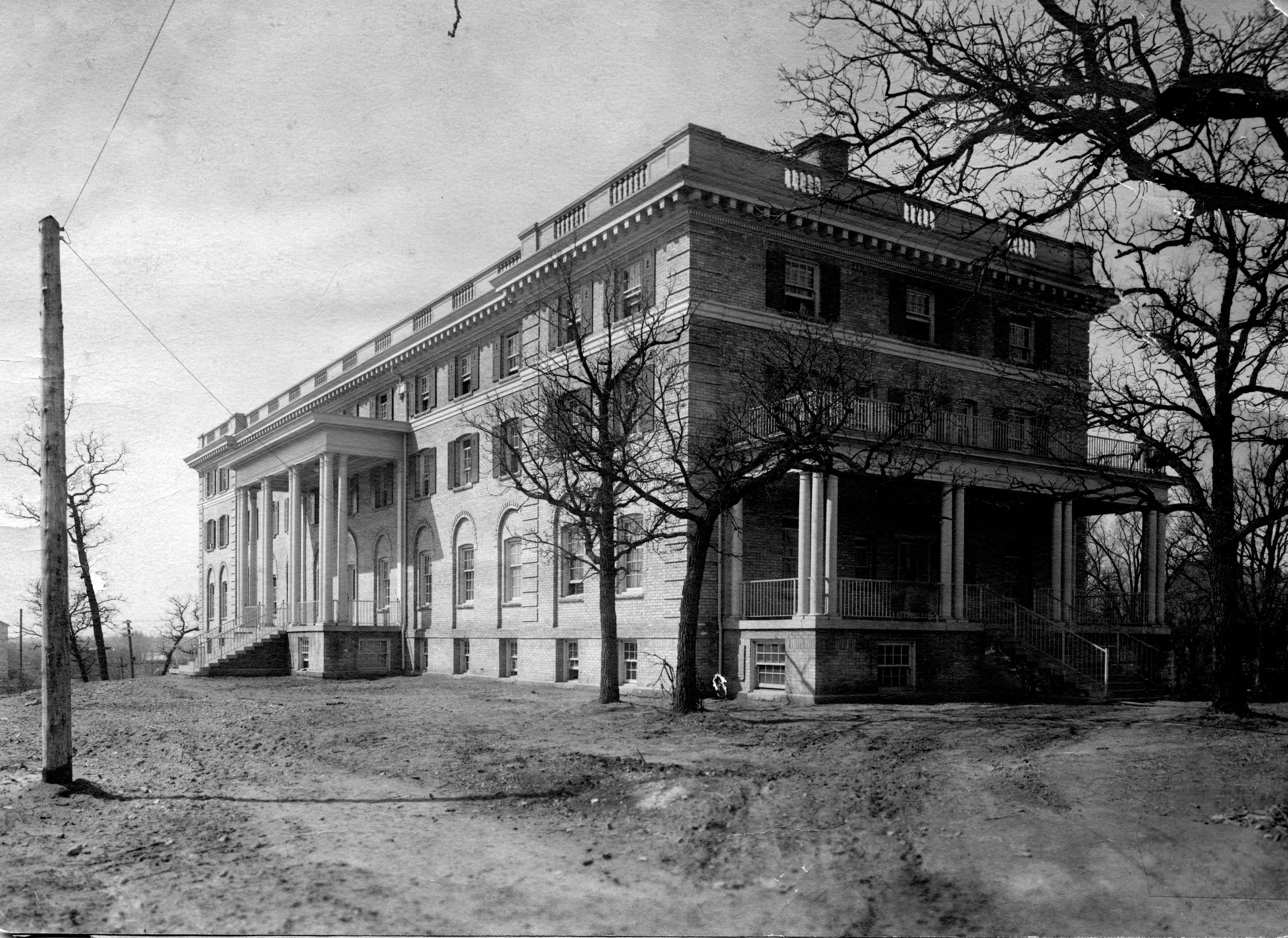
Shoemaker Hall

Shoemaker Hall (St. Cloud State University) is a residence hall that opened in the fall of 1915. It was originally only for women, but it became coed. Shoemaker Hall is the second oldest standing building at St. Cloud State University.

== Need and funding ==
Planning for a new residence hall began by at least mid-1911. In a June 14, 1911, St. Cloud State resident director Clarence Atwood was asked to acquire property for the proposed dormitory. At a November 1912, Minnesota normal school board meeting, a resolution was passed to ask the state legislature for an $80,000 appropriation to construct a new women's dormitory—and granted by the legislature on April 28, 1913. The normal school board acted at their November 21, 1913, meeting, appointing a committee to make recommendations to place the new dormitory. By February 1914, the new dormitory's location was set—the normal school board asked for bids for the sale and removal of two buildings on the west side of 1st Avenue South.

== Construction ==
Circumstances caused delays, including acquisition of additional property, removal of two buildings onsite, and high construction bids. The costs had to be negotiated to be within budget.

Designed by Minnesota state architect Clarence Johnston, construction started in fall 1914 by general contractor Edward Hirt. Construction had been paused due to winter but resumed in the spring of 1915. The building, which featured local yellow brick like Riverview, opened for students in late November 1915.

Sub-contractors included Pioneer Granite (granite), bricks (Hess & Sons), lumber (Mathew Hall), plumbing (J.P. Bisenius), and furniture (Tschumperlin Furniture).

The building was "erected by St. Cloud labor with the use of local material throughout." In addition, the article mentioned the building was built "absolutely fire-proof, with all the modern conveniences, to make the recollections of the students dwelling therein, the fondest in the history of their education."

With 60 rooms to accommodate 110 students, Shoemaker Hall was the first St. Cloud State building placed on the west side of 1st Avenue South. It had a commanding view of the Mississippi River before Eastman Hall opened in 1930.

== Naming and dedication ==
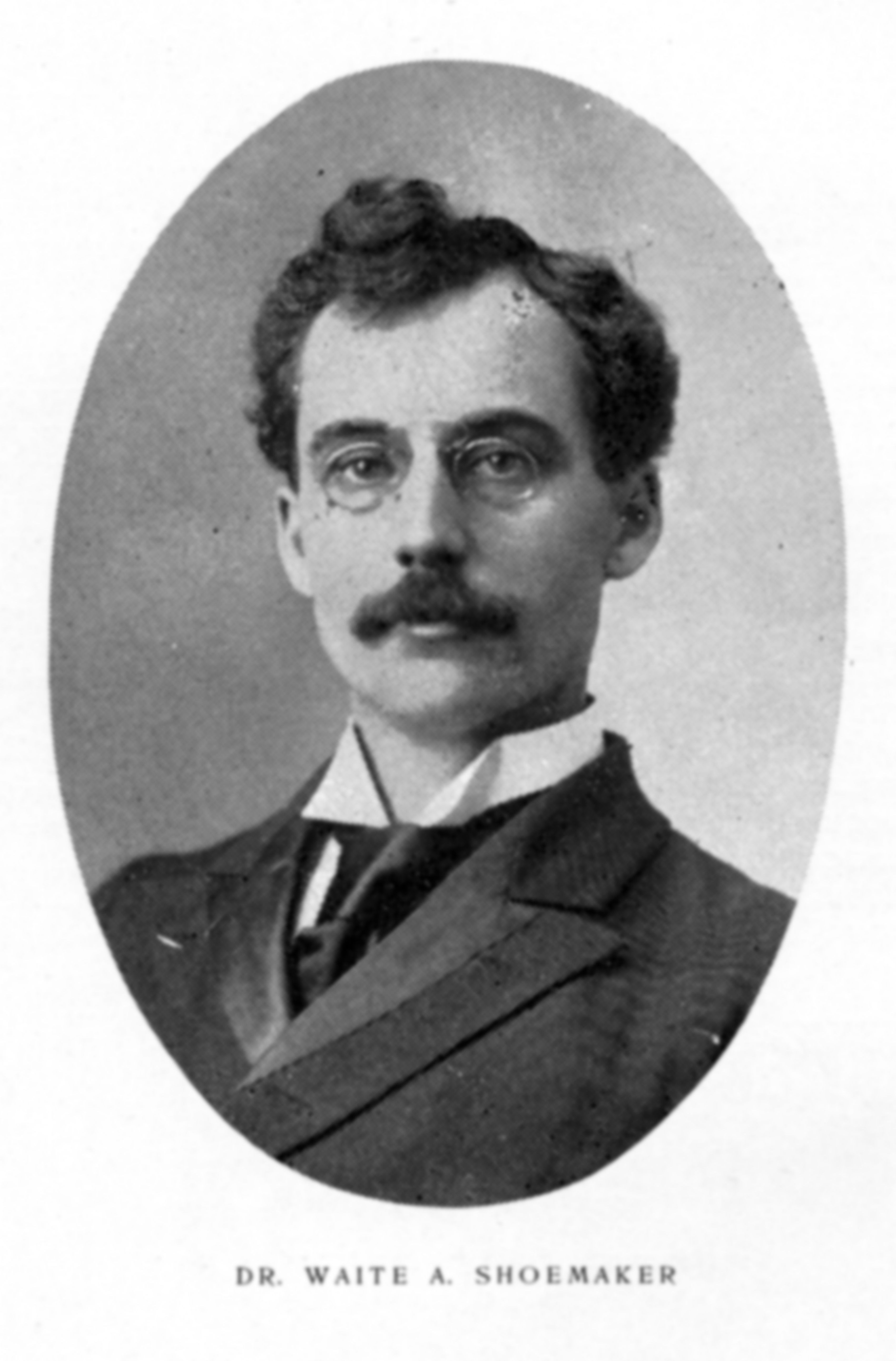
Waite Shoemaker

Though no official action was done by the state normal board, the dormitory has always been known as Shoemaker Hall. Some were calling the under-construction building as "Shoemaker Hall". Due to illness, St. Cloud State president Waite Shoemaker, who was also an alum and faculty member passed away in March 1916. The building was dedicated on June 5, 1916. The dedication program referred to the building as Shoemaker Hall.

== Expansion ==
By the late 1950s, St. Cloud State was determined to provide residence hall space to students, especially men. Designed by Frank Jackson and Associates, construction of the addition to house 400 students began in May 1959. Costing $1.4 million, east (six stories) and west (four stories) wings just south of the existing building were constructed by Wahl Construction Company. The addition also included a two-story central section containing a 275-seat dining room that connected the addition to the 1915 section of Shoemaker Hall, which was remodeled and redecorated at the same time.

The Shoemaker Hall addition rooms on each floor were to be clustered around bathrooms, a lounge, living room, and utility room. This arrangement allowed “more privacy than is provided by dormitories where rooms face each other across the hall.”

Two students were to occupy each room and provided “with two single beds, a lounge chair, two fiberglass study chairs, a vinyl-topped double study desk, separate closets and a book utility shelf.”

The dormitory's main recreation room was on the ground floor and equipped with ping pong tables and shuffleboard as well as a 60-seat television room. A new kitchen and dining room featured “stainless steel equipment, ceramic tile floors and walls, walk-in freezers, modern dishwashers, and a conveyor belt for moving dishes from the dining room to the dishwashing room.”

== Open house ==
On November 22, 1960, an open house featured a buffet supper, dance, and building tours. Held in Shoemaker Hall's recreation room, the dance featured music by the Moon Misters.

== Renovation ==
In the summer of 2011, Shoemaker Hall's 1915 portion was renovated at the cost of $6 million. Bringing the oldest part of the building into the 21st century, the renovation included resurfaced hardwood floors, upgraded ventilation, plumbing, and electrical systems, new energy-efficient restrooms, new furnishings, and new closet storage. A technology center, multipurpose rooms, activity lounge, theater-style video room, card-access entry, and surveillance cameras were also part of the renovation.

The east and west wings were renovated in 2013 and 2014, opening for occupancy for fall 2014. Gutting the entire 1960 addition, the work cost $17.4 million. Features included smaller and more private bathrooms, upgraded Wi-Fi, air conditioning, kitchen and lounge facilities on each floor, two laundry rooms, and a recreational game room.

== Architecture ==
Shoemaker Hall is Federal Revival Style. Federal is a refined version of Georgian architecture, mainly showing recessed arches. If a portico (or porch) is present on a building that is Federal Style, it tends to be less bulky than what one may find on a Georgian style building. The portico seems "heavier" than what one would find on a Federal Style structure in the eastern United States. The balustrade is a key element of Federal Style, but it has been removed. The windows set in recessed arches and the low-pitched roof still survive.
